Lee Tze-fan Memorial Art Gallery is a gallery located in East District, Hsinchu City, Taiwan and dedicated to the Taiwanese painter Lee Tze-fan.

The gallery was established on August 6, 1994, and the building was reconstructed from Lee's former residence. The owner of this gallery is Lee Tze-Fan Memorial Foundation for Art Education. The foundation has been received the donation from Lee's family and students, and focus on researching, collecting and digitizing Lee's paintings and belongings, so they can operate the gallery without selling paintings and fundraising.

One of the gallery's feature is exhibiting Lee's original studio, diaries, letters and painting tools.

References

1994 establishments in Taiwan
Art museums and galleries in Taiwan
Art galleries established in 1994
Buildings and structures in Hsinchu